Jorge Trías Sagnier (13 July 1948 – 13 April 2022) was a Spanish politician.

Biography
A member of the People's Party, he served in the Congress of Deputies from 1996 to 2000. He was known as the whistleblower in the Bárcenas affair, exposing corruption within the People's Party. Trías died in Barcelona on 13 April 2022, at the age of 73, due to the after-effects of a COVID-19 infection, from which he had recovered a few weeks earlier.

References

1948 births
2022 deaths
20th-century Spanish politicians
21st-century Spanish politicians
Spanish whistleblowers
Members of the Congress of Deputies (Spain)
Members of the 6th Congress of Deputies (Spain)
People's Party (Spain) politicians
University of Barcelona alumni
Politicians from Barcelona
Deaths from the COVID-19 pandemic in Spain